Peter Lane may refer to:
 Peter Lane, Baron Lane of Horsell, British politician and businessman
 Sir Peter Richard Lane, British judge
 Peter Van Zandt Lane, American composer